Mohammed Khalfan Zayed Al-Harasi (Arabic:محمد خلفان زايد الحراصي) (born 28 August 1998) is an Emirati footballer. He currently plays for Al Bataeh on loan from Al Ain.

Personal life
Mohamed is the brother of the player Khaled Khalfan and Eisa Khalfan.

External links

References

Emirati footballers
1998 births
Living people
Al Ain FC players
Al Bataeh Club players
UAE Pro League players
Association football wingers